Harry Gold (1910–1972) was a scientist and spy.

Harry Gold may also refer to:

Harry Gold (musician) (1907–2005), British dixieland jazz saxophonist and bandleader
Harry Gold (EastEnders), soap opera character

See also 
 Henry Gold (disambiguation)
 Harry Gould (disambiguation)